The 1998 California Insurance Commissioner election occurred on November 3, 1998. The primary elections took place on June 3, 1998. The Republican incumbent, Chuck Quackenbush, narrowly defeated the Democratic nominee, State Assemblywoman Diane Martinez.

Primary results
Final results from the Secretary of State of California

Democratic

Peace & Freedom

Others

Election results
Final results from the Secretary of State of California.

Results by county

See also
California state elections, 1998
California Insurance Commissioner

References

External links
VoteCircle.com Non-partisan resources & vote sharing network for Californians
Information on the elections from California's Secretary of State

1998 California elections
1998
California